Łuków Forest is the largest forest complex in South Podlachia Plain near Łuków in eastern Poland. Krzna river flows out of the forest. The complex has an area of

History 
Before the Partitions of Poland the forests were the royal wilderness. During the January Uprising the area were used to be a base and shelter of Polish insurgents led by priest Stanisław Brzóska. During the Second World War, partisans of the Polish resistance movement also operated in the area.

Flora 

Species of trees in the forest:

Nature conservation 
In Łuków Forest occur two nature reserves: Jata and Topór.

Object of the protection are fir forests growing out of range occurring the species.

Bibliography 
 
 Superintendency Łuków

Łuków County
Forests of Poland